Fred Coury (born October 20, 1967) is an American musician best known as the drummer for the glam metal band Cinderella. Coury lists Neil Peart, Peter Criss, Bobby Blotzer, John Bonham, Eric Carr, Tommy Lee and Tommy Aldridge as his drumming inspirations.

Early years 
Coury was born in Johnson City, New York, to a Lebanese family. At age 5, Coury started taking violin lessons. At age 6 he participated in his first public performance. Between the ages of 7 and 9 he studied at the Beirut Conservatory of Music in Beirut, Lebanon. At age 10, he added the trumpet to his repertoire. Finally, at age 12 he started to play the drums. By the age of 13, he was playing local bars with the band Sunjammer.  As a teen, Coury was accepted to Berklee School of Music in Boston, for violin.

Career 
Coury has played in other bands including London and Chastain and was playing with Ozzy Osbourne in 1985 filling-in for Randy Castillo who had a leg injury, before he joined Cinderella. Coury got into Cinderella when Eric Singer told him about the gig and encouraged him to audition. Coury sent in a cassette and because as far as everyone knew, according to Circus magazine, he was the drummer for Osbourne, that may have helped him score an audition.

Coury left Cinderella in 1991 and joined Stephen Pearcy of Ratt to form the band Arcade. He also briefly substituted for Guns N' Roses drummer Steven Adler in December 1987 when health issues forced Adler off the road. Coury re-joined Cinderella after Arcade folded. In the summer of 2006, Coury and Cinderella joined Poison on a joint 20th anniversary tour. Coury also filled in for Rikki Rockett during Poison's slot at the Comstock Rock Festival on July 15, 2009, due to the fact that Rockett having had baby the day before, and in 2017 he filled for Night Ranger when his friend Kelly Keagy took a brief leave from tour.

Coury spends most of his time in his Los Angeles recording studio Double Forte Music composing for television and sports. A multi-award-winning composer, Coury has scored all four seasons of NBC's hit series The Night Shift, WGN America's original series Almost Paradise, and also scored the opening theme for the NBC series The Wall.
Coury composed and created the original musical score for the 2019 feature film Full Count.
An avid hockey fan, Coury combined his love of the sport with his musical skills to create the "Goal Song" and sonic identity for the Los Angeles Kings hockey team. In 2017, The L.A. Kings series Black & White, which Coury scores, was nominated and won an Emmy Award. He also provides the sonic identity for the Portland Trail Blazers NBA team, with whom he won a second Emmy award.

Other interests 
In his spare time Coury enjoys storm chasing. He is also a part-time actor and has appeared in several films such as The Human Race or The Junkyard Willie Movie: Lost in Transit. Coury performs mixes for his dance/electronica group called Effcee. Coury is an avid NASCAR fan and can often be seen in 'pit row' alongside the crews.

Coury is also passionate about rescuing animals.

Discography 
 1985 Mystery of Illusion: Chastain – drums
 1990 Heartbreak Station: Cinderella – percussion, drums, background vocals
 1990 Leader of the Banned: Sam Kinison – drums
 1992 Caught in the Middle: Linear – drums
 1992 L.A. Blues Authority: L.A. Blues Authority – drums, vocals, performer
 1993 Arcade: Arcade – drums
 1994 A/2: Arcade – Drums, background vocals
 1994 Jack Daniel's Tour: 1988 Guns N' Roses – drums
 1995 Stairway of Gold: Songs of the Sephardim: Judy Frankel – tambourine, handclapping
 1997 Looking Back: Cinderella – producer, engineer, mixing
 1997 Love Is Suicide: Marshall Coleman – percussion, drums, background vocals
 1997 Once upon A...: Cinderella – Producer
 1999 Live at the Key Club: Cinderella – drums
 1999 Asylum Suite: Asylum Suite – background vocals, producer
 2000 Before and Laughter: Stephen Pearcy – Drums
 2000 Cheap Dream: A Tribute to Cheap Trick: Various artists – remixing
 2000 Remixed to Hell: AC/DC Tribute: Various artists – remixing
 2000 Todd Rundgren: Reconstructed: Todd Rundgren – remixing
 2000 Broken Promises EP: Allen Crane – drums, percussion
 2001 A/3: Live & Unreleased: Arcade – drums, percussion, background vocals
 2001 Dance Mixes: Tavares – remixing
 2001 Love Machine Remixed Hits: The Miracles – remixing, mixing
 2002 Rock Tribute to Guns N' Roses: Various Artists – liner notes, mixing
 2002 Somebody Loves You Back: The Mixes: Teddy Pendergrass – Remixing
 2002 Tribute to Linkin Park: Various Artists – Mixing
 2002 Tribute to Marilyn Manson Various Artists – Bass, Guitar, Programming, Vocals
 2003 Greatest Classics: With a Twist: Todd Rundgren – Remixing
 2004 Blackest Album, Vol. 4: An Industrial Tribute: Various Artists – Producer, Mixing
 2004 Destroy All DJs, Vol. 2: B.P. vs. Effcee – Engineer, Digital Editing
 2004 Destroy All DJs: B.P. vs. Effcee – Pro-Tools
 2004 Gothic Acoustic Tribute to Disturbed: Various Artists – Producer
 2004 Greatest Hits: Love TKO: Teddy Pendergrass – Remixing
 2004 In Concert: Cinderella – Drums, Vocals, Group Member
 2004 Live from the Gypsy Road: Cinderella – Drums, Vocals, Group Member
 2004 Making Tributes Is Easy: The Ultimate Tribute to Radi: Various Artists – Producer
 2004 More '80s Hair Metal: Various Artists – Producer
 2004 Perfect: Effcee – Programming, Producer, Mixing, Group Member
 2004 Rock vs. Rap: Various Artists – Producer
 2004 The Roots of Guns N' Roses: Hollywood Rose – Remixing
 2004 Spin the Bottle: an All-Star Tribute to Kiss: Various Artists – Drums
 2004 Trancemixed Anthems, Vol. 1: Various Artists – Mastering
 2004 Tribute to Incubus [Tributized]: Various Artists – Producer
 2004 Tribute to White Stripes: Various Artists – Producer, Remixing
 2004 Unclean [Bonus DVD]: Pitbull Daycare – Programming, Vocals, Producer, Mixing
 2004 Voodoo Magick: The Godsmack Tribute: Various Artists – Producer
 2005 Best of Club Hits, Vol. 3: Various Artists – Mastering
 2005 Clubmixed, Vol. 2: Various Artists – Mastering
 2005 Destination Lounge: Bali [Bonus DVD]: Various Artists – Mastering
 2005 Greatest Hits Remixed: Marilyn Monroe – Remixing
 2005 In Concert [DVD]: Cinderella – Group Member
 2005 Maximum Workout, Vol. 2: Various Artists – Mastering
 2005 Revive the Soul: Various Artists – Mastering
 2005 Rocked, Wired & Bluesed: The Greatest Hits: Cinderella – Drums, Percussion, Background Vocals
 2005 Rocked, Wired & Bluesed: The Greatest Video Hits: Cinderella – Drums, Percussion, Background Vocals
 2005 Soul Sauce: Various Artists – Mastering
 2005 Ultimate Tribute to Radiohead: Various Artists – Producer
 2005 Ultimate Tribute to U2: Various Artists – Producer
 2005 Best of Club Hits, Vol. 3: Various Artists – Mastering
 2005 Clubmixed, Vol. 2: Various Artists – Mastering
 2005 Destination Lounge: Bali: Various Artists – Mastering
 2005 Electro Goth Tribute to Prince: Various Artists – Producer
 2005 Everything in Between: The Numb Ones – Background Vocals, Producer, Mixing
 2005 Genius Remixed [Hypnotic]: Ray Charles – Remixing
 2005 Greatest Hits Remixed: Marilyn Monroe – Remixing
 2005 In Concert [DVD]: Cinderella – Drums, Group Member
 2005 Revive the Soul: Various Artists – Mastering
 2005 Rocked, Wired & Bluesed: The Greatest Hits: Cinderella – Percussion, Drums, Background Vocals, Group Member
 2005 Rocked, Wired & Bluesed: The Greatest Video Hits: Cinderella	- Percussion, Drums, Background Vocals, Group Member
 2005 Soul Sauce: Various Artists – Mastering
 2005 Ultimate Tribute to U2: Various Artists – Producer
 2006 '80s Metal Hits: Various Artists – Producer
 2006 All Star Tribute to Bon Jovi: Various Artists – Producer
 2006 Extended Versions: Cinderella – Drums, Background Vocals
 2006 Gold: Cinderella – Percussion, Drums, Background Vocals
 2006 Gothic Divas Presents Switchblade Symphony: Various Artists – Producer
 2006 Gypsy Road: Live: Cinderella – Group Member
 2006 World's Greatest Metal Tribute to Led Zeppelin: Various Artists – Drums, Mixing
 2007 Heavy Metal Box [Rhino]: Various Artists – Drums
 2007 Heavy Metal [Box Set]: Various Artists – Drums
 2007 Too Fast for Love: A Millennium Tribute to Mötley Crüe: Various Artists – Engineer, Drum Programming, Mixing, Drum Producer
 2008 Cinderella: Live in Concert: Cinderella – Drums, Vocals, Group Member
 2009 Already There: Debbie Gibson – Drums, Producer, Mixing
 2008 Under My Skin: Stephen Pearcy – Drums, Drum Engineering, Musician
 2009 '80s Metal: A Double Dose: Various Artists – Drums, Producer
 2009 80s Hair Metal Goes Classic: Various Artists – Drums, Mixing
 2009 Authorized Bootleg: Live at the Tokyo Dome: Cinderella – Drums, Group Member
 2009 Lou Gramm Band: Lou Gramm – Mixing
 2009 Spectacular! (Music From the Nickelodeon Original Movie Original TV Soundtrack) – Drums
 2009 Hannah Montana: The Movie – Drums
 2009 High School Musical 3 – Drums
 2011 Sacha Baron Cohen's The Dictator – Drums
 2012 Ubisoft's Just Dance 4 – Drums
 2019 Fast & furious presents: Hobbs & Shaw'' – Drums

References 

1966 births
American heavy metal drummers
American people of Lebanese descent
American television composers
Cinderella (band) members
Glam metal musicians
Living people
Male television composers
People from Johnson City, New York
Chastain (band) members
20th-century American drummers
American male drummers